Panaeolus tropicalis is a species of psilocybin producing mushroom in the family Bolbitiaceae. It is also known as Copelandia tropicalis.

Description 
The cap is 1.5 — 2(2.5) cm and hemispheric to convex to companulate. The margin is incurved when young, clay-colored, often reddish brown towards the disc, hygrophanous, smooth, and grayish to greenish; it is translucent-striate at the margin when wet. It becomes blue when bruised.
The gills are adnexed, distinctly mottled, and dully grayish with blackish spots.
The stipe is 5–12 cm long, 2–3 mm thick, hollow, and vertically striate. It is blackish towards the base, greyish towards the apex, and pallid to whitish fibrils run the length of the stipe. The stipe is equal to slightly swollen at the base and lacks a partial veil.
Panaeolus tropicalis spores are dark violet to jet black, ellipsoid, and 10.5–12.0 x 7–9 µm. The basidia each produce two spores.

Like many other hallucinogenic mushrooms, this fungus readily bruises blue where it is handled. It can be differentiated from Panaeolus cyanescens by microscopic characteristics.

Distribution and habitat 

Panaeolus tropicalis is a mushroom that grows on dung. It is most often found in Hawaii, Central Africa, and Cambodia; it can also be found in Mexico, Tanzania, the Philippines, Florida, and Japan.

See also 

 List of Panaeolus species

External links 
 Photo of Panaeolus tropicalis
  (on Fondazione Museo Civico di Rovereto)

Entheogens
tropicalis
Psychoactive fungi
Psychedelic tryptamine carriers
Fungi of North America
Fungi of South America
Fungi of Asia
Fungi of Africa
Fungi of Hawaii
Fungi without expected TNC conservation status